Simplicia may refer to:
 Simplicia (automobile), a defunct French automobile manufacturer
 Simplicia (moth), a genus of moth
 Simplicia (plant), a genus of plants in the grass family